Soyuz TM-19 was a crewed Soyuz spaceflight to Mir. It launched on 1 July 1994, at 12:24:50 UTC.

Crew

Mission highlights
Commander Malenchenko and Flight Engineer Musabayev, both spaceflight rookies, were to have been launched with veteran cosmonaut Gennadi Strekalov, who would have returned to Earth with Viktor Afanasyev and Yuri Usachov in Soyuz TM-18 after a few days on Mir. However, the cancellation of one of two Progress-M cargo ships scheduled to resupply Mir during the Agat crew's stay meant that Strekalov's couch had to carry supplies. The result was the first all-rookie Soyuz flight since Soyuz 25 in October 1977. Docking occurred without incident on July 3. Both cosmonauts and Doctor Valeri Polyakov (who had arrived on Soyuz TM-18) became the 16th resident crew; many technical problems with the station arose during this expedition, necessitating a previously untried manual supply docking by Malenchenko. On November 3, Malenchenko, Musabayev and Merbold undocked in Soyuz TM-19 and backed 190m from Mir. They then activated the Kurs automatic approach system, which successfully redocked the spacecraft. The cosmonauts then transferred back to Mir. The test was related to the difficulties Soyuz TM-20 and Progress M-24 experienced during their automatic approaches. Final undocking and reentry occurred the following day without incident.

Mission accomplishments
Docked with Mir
Partial crew exchange
Conducted medical experiments
Conducted materials experiments
Malenchenko and Musabayev perform EVA on 09.09.1994 (5h 6m) to repair station's external insulation
Both cosmonauts repeat EVA on 14.09.1994 (6h 1m) for same purpose
First successful manual docking of a Progress supply ship

Notes

Crewed Soyuz missions
Spacecraft launched in 1994